Jacob Millard Fretz (October 5, 1912 – April 11, 1999) was an American football coach.  He was the head football coach at Bethel College in North Newton, Kansas, serving for three seasons, from 1949 to 1951, and compiling a record of 5–21. Fretz died in 1999.

Head coaching record

References

1912 births
1999 deaths
Bethel Threshers football coaches
People from Lansdale, Pennsylvania